is a former Japanese football player.

Playing career
Nishiwaki was born in Chiba Prefecture on May 22, 1977. After graduating from Waseda University, he joined J2 League club Omiya Ardija in 2000. He played several matches as midfielder from first season. However he could hardly play in the match in 2002 and retired end of 2002 season.

Club statistics

References

External links

1977 births
Living people
Waseda University alumni
Association football people from Chiba Prefecture
Japanese footballers
J2 League players
Omiya Ardija players
Association football midfielders